Mary Ann Dyer "Molly" Goodnight (September 12, 1839 – April 11, 1926) was an American cattlewoman and rancher married to prominent Texas rancher and cattleman Charles Goodnight. She was a 1991 inductee of the National Cowgirl Museum and Hall of Fame.

Life
Mary Ann (Molly) Goodnight was born Mary Ann Dyer on September 12, 1839, in Madison County, Tennessee. In 1854, when she was 14, Goodnight's parents brought her to Belknap, Texas. Not soon after her parents died, then she had to care for her five brothers. Around 1864, she met Charles Goodnight at Fort Belknap. In the 1860s, she taught in Weatherford, Texas. Goodnight married Charles in Hickman, Kentucky, on July 26, 1870.

Ranching
They had a seven-year try at ranching in Colorado, but soon moved back to Texas. Charles established a partnership with John George Adair. Charles' partnership enabled him to co-found the famous JA Ranch in Palo Duro Canyon in the Texas Panhandle in 1877.

Goodnight established her proper place as wife and helper with Charles, the most famous rancher on the High Plains. Beyond her regular chores, Goodnight took it upon herself to rescue baby bison left behind by hunters, soon establishing the Goodnight buffalo herd. In 1887, they moved to Armstrong County, Texas, where Goodnight spent the remainder of her life. Goodnight assisted in establishing Goodnight College in 1898.

Death and legacy
Goodnight died on April 11, 1926, in Armstrong County. In 1888, the Goodnights built the Goodnight Ranch House in Goodnight, Texas. The house is located in Armstrong County, Texas, at US 287 and 5000 Block County Road 25. It was listed on the National Register of Historic Places in 2007. It came to house the Charles and Mary Ann (Molly) Goodnight Ranch House, which was a museum. In the 1860s Charles and Oliver Loving created the Goodnight-Loving Trail, which was a cattle drive in the late 1860s for the movement of large herds of Texas Longhorns from Texas to Wyoming.

References 

1839 births
1926 deaths
American cattlewomen
American pioneers
Ranchers from Texas
People from Pueblo, Colorado
Agricultural buildings and structures on the National Register of Historic Places in Texas
Houses on the National Register of Historic Places in Texas
National Register of Historic Places in Randall County, Texas
People from Armstrong County, Texas
Cowgirl Hall of Fame inductees